Katrina Nannestad is an Australian writer of books for children.

Career 
Following her graduation from the University of New England, Armidale with qualifications in English and education, Nannestad began her career as a school teacher.

Her first book, Bungaloo Creek, was published by ABC Books in 2001.

Annie Waters concluded her review of We Are Wolves saying, "I guarantee that the Wolf children will find a place in your heart".

As of 2022, Nannestad was living in Bendigo, Victoria.

Awards 
The Girl Who Brought Mischief

 Winner, Patricia Wrightson Prize for Children's Books, New South Wales Premier's Literary Awards, 2014

We Are Wolves

 Winner, Children and Young Adult category, Historical Novel Society Australasia, 2021
 Winner, Children's Literature Award, Adelaide Festival Awards for Literature, 2022

Rabbit, Soldier, Angel, Thief

 Winner, Children's book, Indie Awards, 2022
 Winner, Booksellers Choice Award, Children's Book of the Year, 2022
 Winner, Shadowers' Choice Award, Book of the Year: Younger Readers, CBCA Book of the Year Awards, 2022
 Winner, Children and Young Adult category, Historical Novel Society Australasia, 2022

Selected works

Stand-alone titles 

 Bungaloo Creek, illustrated by Stephen Axelsen, 2001
 The Girl Who Brought Mischief, 2013
We Are Wolves, illustrated by Martina Heiduczek, 2020
 Rabbit, Soldier, Angel, Thief, 2021

Book series 

 Red Dirt Diaries series, 2010–
 Olive of Groves series, illustrated by Lucia Masciullo, 2015–
 The Girl, the Dog and the Writer series, 2017–
 Lottie Perkins series, illustrated by Makoto Koji, 2018–
 Mim series, 2021–

References

External links 

 

Living people
Year of birth missing (living people)
Australian children's writers
21st-century Australian women writers
University of New England (Australia) alumni